John G. Matteson (born Johan Gottlieb Mathiasen; May 1, 1835 – March 30, 1896) was a Seventh-day Adventist minister, evangelist, teacher, and missionary in Scandinavia, as well as a musician who edited and published the first Danish-Norwegian songbook.

Background 
Matteson was born in Tranekær, Langeland, Denmark in 1835 to Hans C. and Karen Sonia Johanson Mathiason. Even though he came from a poor family, he was given a good education in literature and music. Two years after starting work as a postal clerk, he immigrated to the United States in 1855 with his parents and two sisters and made their home in New Denmark, Wisconsin. Matteson became a Christian at the age of 24 and the next year went to a Baptist seminary in Chicago to become a minister. After his graduation two years later, he married Anna Sieverson, who had been born in Tromsø, Norway. They later had seven children together. They moved to Wisconsin, where Matteson ministered to a Danish-speaking Baptist church.

Adventism 
Matteson and his wife became Seventh-day Adventists in 1863, and Matteson converted almost all of the members of the Baptist church, making it the second Scandinavian Seventh-day Adventist Church in the United States. Matteson became an evangelist and preached the Seventh-day Adventist message of the love of God. From his preaching, many churches were established in the Midwest. He wrote the first Danish language tract, "" ('The New Testament Sabbath'). He also edited the first Seventh-day Adventist Danish-Norwegian songbook. Matteson became editor of Advent Tidende at the age of 37, a Scandinavian magazine for members in the United States. This magazine was also sent to Scandinavia which sparked a large interest in the Seventh-day Adventist Church and a request for missionaries. Matteson and his family moved to Denmark in 1877; his preaching in Denmark and Norway led many to be baptized into the Seventh-day Adventist Church. The growth of the church was so great that in 1880 the first conference was established outside the United States, with headquarters in Christiania, now Oslo. He founded a publishing house in Christiana which published books, magazines, and tracts that led to many baptisms. Matteson came back to the United States in 1888, and continued to be editor of the church's Scandinavian publications. He also taught Bible classes in the Danish-Norwegian department at Union College.

Illness and death 
Halfway through his third year at Union College, he became sick and went to live with his son in Southern California, hoping to get better. Matteson died two months later from chronic bronchitis. He died March 30, 1896 at 60 years old, in Los Angeles County. Matteson is buried at Woodlawn Memorial Cemetery in Santa Monica, Los Angeles County.

His autobiography  (The Life of Matteson) was published in Danish and English.

References

1835 births
1896 deaths
American Seventh-day Adventists
American Seventh-day Adventist missionaries
Danish emigrants to the United States
Danish Seventh-day Adventists
Converts to Adventism
Former Baptists
Seventh-day Adventist ministers
Seventh-day Adventist missionaries in Denmark
Seventh-day Adventist missionaries in Norway
Union College (Nebraska) faculty